This article is about the US number-one songs chart held during the 1940s.

Billboard number-one singles chart (which preceded the Billboard Hot 100 chart), which was updated weekly by the Billboard magazine, was the main singles chart of the American music industry since 1940 and until the Billboard Hot 100 chart was established in 1958.

Before the Billboard Hot 100 chart was established in August 1958, which was based on a formula combining sales data of commercially available singles and airplay on American radio stations, the Billboard used to publish several song popularity charts weekly. Throughout most of the 1940s the magazine published the following three charts:

Best Selling Singles – ranked the biggest selling singles in retail stores, as reported by merchants surveyed throughout the country.
Most Played Juke Box Records (debuted January 1944) – ranked the most played songs in jukeboxes across the United States.
Most Played by Jockeys (debuted February 1945) – ranked the most played songs on United States radio stations, as reported by radio disc jockeys and radio stations.

The list below includes the Best Selling Singles chart only.

Number ones 
Key
 – Number-one single of the year

Statistics by decade

By artist 
The following artists achieved three or more number-one hits from 1940–1949. A number of artists had number-one singles on their own, as well as part of a collaboration.

Artists by total number of weeks at number-one 
The following artists were featured at the top of the chart for the highest total number of weeks from 1940 to 1949.

Singles by total number of weeks at number-one 
The following singles were featured at the top of the chart for the highest total number of weeks from 1940 to 1949.

See also
 List of Billboard number-one singles
 1940s in music

References

United States
 1940s
1940s in American music